The Metal Shop, also known as Aeronautical Lab B, was a historic building located at 1022 South Burrill Avenue on the campus of the University of Illinois at Urbana–Champaign. Built in 1895, the building served as a metal shop for the university's architecture and engineering students. Nathan Clifford Ricker, who later served as Dean of the College of Engineering, designed the building. The design was more functional than Ricker's other work on the campus; its only decorative element is a brick arched loggia in front of the entrance.

The building was added to the National Register of Historic Places on November 9, 1986. It was demolished in 1993 but is still listed on the National Register.

References

University and college buildings on the National Register of Historic Places in Illinois
Buildings and structures of the University of Illinois Urbana-Champaign
Buildings and structures completed in 1895
National Register of Historic Places in Champaign County, Illinois
Buildings and structures in Urbana, Illinois
1895 establishments in Illinois
1993 disestablishments in Illinois
Buildings and structures demolished in 1993